The following is a list of games distributed, developed and/or published by Interplay Entertainment.

References

Interplay